Lee Jae-Hyuk (Hangul: 이재혁, Hanja: 李在赫) (born May 20, 1969, in Andong, Gyeongsangbuk-do, South Korea) is a retired South Korean amateur boxer.

Career
Lee won a bronze medal in the men's featherweight (57 kg) division at the 1988 Summer Olympics in Seoul. In the tournament, he beat future WBC Lightweight champion Miguel Ángel González and future World Amateur Championship gold medalist Kirkor Kirkorov by unanimous decision.

Results

External links
 sports-reference profile
 databaseolympics profile

1969 births
Living people
Featherweight boxers
Boxers at the 1988 Summer Olympics
Olympic boxers of South Korea
Olympic bronze medalists for South Korea
Olympic medalists in boxing
South Korean male boxers
Medalists at the 1988 Summer Olympics
People from Andong